Lorenzo Masetti (born 15 February 2001) is an Italian footballer who plays as a defender for  club Piacenza on loan from Pisa.

Club career
He made his Serie B debut for Pisa on 5 December 2020 in a game against SPAL. He substituted Alessandro De Vitis in the 61st minute of a 0–4 away loss.

On 20 July 2021, he joined Ancona-Matelica on loan. On 19 August 2022, Masetti was loaned to Piacenza.

References

External links
 

2001 births
Living people
Footballers from Florence
Italian footballers
Association football defenders
Serie B players
Serie C players
Pisa S.C. players
Ancona-Matelica players
Piacenza Calcio 1919 players